The Persian Constitution of 1906 , was the first constitution of the Sublime State of Persia (Qajar Iran), resulting from the Persian Constitutional Revolution and it was written by Hassan Pirnia, Hossein Pirnia, and Esmail Momtaz, among others. The Constitution was also in effect during Pahlavi Iran. It divides into five chapters with many articles that developed over several years. The Quran was the foundation of this constitution while the Belgian constitution served as a partial model for the document.

The electoral and fundamental laws of 1906
The electoral and fundamental laws of 1906 established the electoral system and the internal frameworks of the Majlis (Parliament) and the Senate.

By the royal proclamation of August 5, 1906, Mozzafar al-Din Shah created this first constitution "for the peace and tranquility of all the people of Persia."  Mohammad Ali Shah Qajar is credited with chapters 4 and 5.

The electoral law of September 9, 1906
The electoral law of September 9, 1906 defined the regulations for the Elections to the Majlis.

Disenfranchised
Article 3 of this chapter stated that (1) women, (2) foreigners, (3) those under 25, (4) "persons notorious for mischievous opinions," (5) those with a criminal record, (6) active military personnel, and a few other groups are not permitted to vote.

Election qualifications
Article 4 stated that the elected must be (1) fully literate in Persian, (2) "they must be Iranian subjects of Iranian extraction," (3) "be locally known," (4) "not be in government employment," (5) be between 30 and 70 years old, and (6) "have some insight into affairs of State."

Article 7 asserted, "Each elector has one vote and can only vote in one [social] class."

The fundamental laws of December 30, 1906
The fundamental laws of December 30, 1906 defined the role of the Majlis in the system and its framework. It further defined a bicameral legislature. Article 1 established the National Consultative Assembly based "on justice."  Article 43 stated, "There shall be constituted another Assembly, entitled the Senate."

Constitutional Amendment of 1907 

Among the topics discussed in the amendment, was the declaration of Twelver Shi'ism as the state religion and establishment of a council of 5 high ranking Twelver Shia clerics tasked to make sure the laws passed by the parliament are not against the laws of Islam. Also among the topics were articles about the rights of the people and articles describing the flag of Iran and setting Tehran as the capital of the country.

See also

 Constitutionalization attempts in Iran
 1949 Iranian Constituent Assembly
 1963 Iranian referendum
 Constitution of Islamic Republic of Iran

References and notes

Further reading

External links

 Iran's 1906 Constitution and Its Supplement 
 Constitution of Iran, 1906 (in Persian)
 Constitutional Revolution from Iran Chamber Society

Persian Constitutional Revolution
Defunct constitutions
Constitution, 1906
Politics of Qajar Iran
1906 in Iran
1906 in law
Constitution, 1906
1906 documents
Constitutions of Iran
1900s in Islam